Biasmia guttata is a species of beetle in the family Cerambycidae. It was described by Pascoe in 1864. It is known from South Africa.

References

Crossotini
Beetles described in 1864